Criquetot-le-Mauconduit is a commune in the Seine-Maritime department in the Normandy region in northern France.

The inhabitants of the town of Criquetot-le-Mauconduit are called Criquetotais, Criquetotaises in French.

Geography

Population

Places of interest
 The church of St. Rémy, dating from the twelfth century.

See also
Communes of the Seine-Maritime department

References

Communes of Seine-Maritime